Edward Nouri Zalta (born March 16, 1952) is an American philosopher who is a senior research scholar at the Center for the Study of Language and Information at Stanford University. He received his BA at Rice University in 1975 and his PhD from the University of Massachusetts Amherst in 1981, both in philosophy. Zalta has taught courses at Stanford University, Rice University, the University of Salzburg, and the University of Auckland. Zalta is also the Principal Editor of the Stanford Encyclopedia of Philosophy.

Research

Zalta's most notable philosophical position is descended from the position of Alexius Meinong and Ernst Mally, who suggested that there are many non-existent objects. On Zalta's account, some objects (the ordinary concrete ones around us, like tables and chairs) exemplify properties, while others (abstract objects like numbers, and what others would call "non-existent objects", like the round square, and the mountain made entirely of gold) merely encode them. While the objects that exemplify properties are discovered through traditional empirical means, a simple set of axioms allows us to know about objects that encode properties. For every set of properties, there is exactly one object that encodes exactly that set of properties and no others. This allows for a formalized ontology.

References

Works cited

External links 
 
 

1952 births
American logicians
American philosophers
Analytic philosophers
Articles containing video clips
Epistemologists
Living people
Metaphysicians
Ontologists
Philosophers of language
Philosophers of logic
Philosophers of mathematics
Philosophers of mind
Rationalists
Rice University alumni
Rice University staff
Stanford University staff
University of Massachusetts Amherst College of Humanities and Fine Arts alumni